Bangladesh–Singapore relations refer to the bilateral relations between Bangladesh and Singapore.

History
Singapore recognised Bangladesh in February 1972 after the Independence of Bangladesh. Md Mustafizur Rahman is the Bangladeshi High Commissioner to Singapore. The president of Bangladesh Zillur Rahman died in a hospital in Singapore on 20 March 2013.

On 20 January 2016 Singapore deported 27 construction workers from Bangladesh for planning terrorist attacks in Bangladesh. The group was described as the first foreign terrorist group in Singapore. Bangladesh filed terrorism related cases against 14 of them. On 3 May 2016 eight more workers from Bangladesh were deported for having ties with the Islamic State terror group.

On 9 August 2016 Bangladesh and Singapore signed an agreement to produce a joint power plant. Senior Minister of State for Defence and Foreign Affairs Maliki Osman toured Bangladesh from 24 to 26 October 2016. He talked about improving relations and anti terrorism cooperation.

Economic relations
Singapore is one of the biggest market for the export of manpower from Bangladesh. Singapore Airlines operates flight to and from Bangladesh, while Biman Bangladesh Airlines flights to and from Singapore.

References

 
Singapore
Bilateral relations of Singapore